Pringsheimiella is a genus of green algae, in the family Ulvellaceae.

The genus name of Pringsheimiella is in honour of Nathanael Pringsheim (1823–1894), who was a German botanist. 

The genus was circumscribed by Franz Xaver Rudolf von Höhnel in Ann. Mykol. vol.18 on page 97 in 1920.

Several species have been moved into other genera;
 P. crenulata  now accepted as Ulvella crenulata 
 P. marchantiae  accepted as Ulvella marchantiae 
 P. mauritiana  accepted as Ulvella mauritiana 
 P. sanctae-luciae  accepted as Ulvella santae-luciae 
 P. scutata  accepted as Ulvella scutata 
 P. striata  accepted as Ulvella striata 
 P. udotea  accepted as Ulvella udoteae

References

Ulvophyceae genera
Ulvales